The  were a class of ten destroyers of the Imperial Japanese Navy in service before and during World War II. The overall layout of the class proved successful in service and created a powerful ship that served as the basis for the design of the following two classes of destroyers.

Background
However, given the limitations of the 1930 London Naval Treaty, it was considered impossible to modify these vessels any further to improve their specifications. This obstacle was removed after the Japanese government decided to allow the treaty to expire without renewal. The final four vessels of a projected 14 destroyers in the Shiratsuyu class were cancelled, and the larger new Asashio-class vessels were approved under the Maru-2 Supplementary Naval Expansion Budget of 1934, with construction spanning 1937-1939 as the treaty did not officially expire until December 31, 1936. All ten vessels were lost in the Pacific War.

Design
The Asashio-class was the first Japanese destroyer class to exceed 2,000 tons displacement and the first to be equipped with sonar. The hull was 30 feet longer than the Shiratsuyu-class and displacement was increased by 300 tons.

The Asashio-class was powered by two steam turbine engines with two shafts, powered by three boilers, which operated at higher temperatures than the Shiratsuyu-class. The Asashio-class was thus one knot faster than the Shiratsuyu-class despite the larger size and displacement of the vessels. However, during sea trials, early critical issues were discovered, especially with the reliability of the new steam turbines. Another issue was with design of the rudder, which initially led to problems with the ship's turning radius. These issues were addressed by the start of the Pacific War with a modified stern and rudder.

Armament
In terms of armament, the Asashio class reverted to the previous  main battery layout of 3 twin mount 12.7 cm/50 Type 3 naval guns, instead of the 5-gun design of the more recent  and  classes that were constructed under treaty limitations. There was one twin turret forward of the bridge and a superfiring pair of twin turrets aft. The guns were capable of 55-degree elevation. Also, the position of the "X" turret at the shelter deck level forward of the quarterdeck "Y" turret, gave the Asashio class a different silhouette than the Shiratsuyu class, where both turrets were at quarterdeck level.

The torpedo armament eight Type 93 torpedo in two quadruple launchers  as on the Shiratsuyu-class was retained, with eight reloads stored in a deckhouse on the centerline of the ship. At the start of the war, the Asashio-class was also equipped with 16 depth charges, while previous classes carried 18. Later in the war, the number of depth charges was increased to 36, and to compensate for the weight, one set of four torpedo reloads was removed.

In terms of anti-aircraft capability, initially two twin-mount Type 96 AA guns were placed forward of the second smokestack. The Asashio-class was the first destroyers to receive this type of gun. As the war progressed, the number of Type 96 guns was gradually increased. In 1942-1943, the twin-mounts were replaced by triple-mounts, and another twin-mount was added forward of the bridge. From 1943-1944, on surviving vessels the superfiring "X" turret was removed and replaced by two more triple-mounts. After 1944, surviving vessels were fitted with between eight and twelve additional single-mounts, and  received also two Type 93 13mm machine guns. In late 1944, the final four survivors (Kasumi, and ) received a Type 22 and a Type 13 radar.

Operational history
During the war the Asashio class was used extensively in the protection of the Combined Fleet. Kasumi was also heavily damaged along with one other destroyer. Asashio and Arashio escorted the 7th Cruiser Division at the Battle of Midway, where both were damaged by air attack. Although repaired and returned to service, both were sunk in 1943 when a large Japanese transport force was destroyed by American planes in the Battle of the Bismarck Sea. Michishio, Asagumo, and Yamagumo were lost in 1944 in the Battle of Leyte Gulf. Kasumi, last of the class to be laid down, served as escort on the attack on Pearl Harbor and joined the battleship  during Operation Ten-Go against the American fleet at Okinawa. None of the Asashio-class ships survived the Pacific War.

List of ships

See also
List of ship classes of the Second World War

Notes

Books

External links

Destroyer classes
 
World War II destroyers of Japan